The Yuba Forest Reserve was established by the U.S. Forest Service in California on November 11, 1905 with . On September 17, 1906 the forest was combined with the Tahoe Forest Reserve and the name was discontinued.

References

External links
Forest History Society
Listing of the National Forests of the United States and Their Dates (from the Forest History Society website) Text from Davis, Richard C., ed. Encyclopedia of American Forest and Conservation History. New York: Macmillan Publishing Company for the Forest History Society, 1983. Vol. II, pp. 743-788.

Former National Forests of California
1905 establishments in California
Defunct forest reserves of the United States